Angola Olympic football team represents Angola in international football competitions in Olympic Games. The selection is limited to players under the age of 23, except during the Olympic Games where the use of three overage players is allowed. The team is controlled by the Angolan Football Federation.

CAF U-23 Championship record

African Games record

External links
Federação Angolana de Futebol official site

References

Under
African national under-23 association football teams